The 2015 BGL Luxembourg Open was a women's tennis tournament played on indoor hard courts sponsored by BNP Paribas. It was the 20th edition of the Luxembourg Open, and part of the WTA International tournaments category of the 2015 WTA Tour. It was held in Kockelscheuer, Luxembourg, on 19–25 October 2015.

Points and prize money

Point distribution

Prize money

1 Qualifiers prize money is also the Round of 32 prize money
* per team

Singles entrants

Seeds 

 Rankings as of 12 October 2015

Other entrants 
The following players received wildcards into the singles main draw:
  Tessah Andrianjafitrimo
  Mandy Minella
  Stefanie Vögele

The following players received entry from the qualifying draw:
  Jana Čepelová
  Julie Coin
  Richèl Hogenkamp
  Anna Tatishvili

The following players received entry as lucky losers:
  Océane Dodin
  Laura Siegemund

Withdrawals 
Before the tournament
  Julia Görges (right neck injury)→replaced by  Océane Dodin
  Daniela Hantuchová →replaced by  Denisa Allertová
  Lucie Hradecká (change of schedule)→replaced by  Laura Siegemund
  Madison Keys →replaced by  Anna-Lena Friedsam
  Sabine Lisicki →replaced by  Andreea Mitu
  Magdaléna Rybáriková →replaced by  Urszula Radwańska
  Roberta Vinci →replaced by  Misaki Doi

Retirements 
  Urszula Radwańska (low back injury)
  Timea Bacsinszky (left knee injury)
  Alison Van Uytvanck (viral illness)

Doubles entrants

Seeds 

 1 Rankings as of 12 October 2015

Other entrants
The following pair received a wildcard into the doubles main draw:
  Claudia Coppola /  Sílvia Soler Espinosa

Finals

Singles 

 Misaki Doi defeated  Mona Barthel, 6–4, 6–7(7–9), 6–0

Doubles

  Mona Barthel /  Laura Siegemund defeated  Anabel Medina Garrigues /  Arantxa Parra Santonja, 6–2, 7–6(7–2)

External links 
 
 WTA tournament profile
 WTA tournament draws

2015 WTA Tour
2015
2015 in Luxembourgian tennis